North Persia Force (Norper force) was a British military force that operated in Northern Persia from 1918–1919.

Composition
The force was a large brigade which consisted of:
 1st Battalion, Royal Irish Fusiliers
 1st Battalion, 42nd Deoli Regiment
 122nd Rajputana Infantry
 1st Battalion, 2nd Gurkha Rifles
 Guides Cavalry
 A Battery (The Chestnut Troop) Royal Horse Artillery
 No. 30 Squadron RAF
 15th Light Armoured Motor Battery
 31st Indian Pack Battery
 48th Divisional Signal Company
 19th Company 3rd Sappers and Miners
 Reinforcements sent from Mesopotamia:
 1st Battalion, Royal Berkshire Regiment
 2nd Battalion, York and Lancaster Regiment
 2 platoons of the 1st Battalion, 67th Punjabis were based at Tabriz

The force was commanded by Brigadier General Hugh Bateman-Champain who was based at Kasvin.

Footnotes

References

Further reading

External links
 

Ad hoc units and formations of the British Army
Military history of Qajar Iran
20th century in Iran